Aubrey Independent School District is a public school district based in Aubrey, Texas (USA). In addition to Aubrey, the district also serves the city of Krugerville and a portion of Cross Roads and Providence Village. The district operates one high school, Aubrey High School.

Finances
As of the 2010-2011 school year, the appraised valuation of property in the district was $539,782,000. The maintenance tax rate was $0.104 and the bond tax rate was $0.050 per $100 of appraised valuation.

Academic achievement
In 2011, the school district was rated "recognized" by the Texas Education Agency.  Thirty-five percent of districts in Texas in 2011 received the same rating. No state accountability ratings will be given to districts in 2012. A school district in Texas can receive one of four possible rankings from the Texas Education Agency: Exemplary (the highest possible ranking), Recognized, Academically Acceptable, and Academically Unacceptable (the lowest possible ranking).

Historical district TEA accountability ratings
2011: Recognized
2010: Recognized
2009: Recognized
2008: Recognized
2007: Academically Acceptable
2006: Academically Acceptable
2005: Academically Acceptable
2004: Recognized

Schools
In the 2022-2023 school year the district had students in six schools.
Regular instructional
Aubrey High School (Grades 9-12)
Aubrey Middle School (Grades 6-8)
Brockett Elementary School (Grades K-5)
Monaco Elementary School (Grades PK-5)
Fuller Elementary School (Grades PK-5)
Early Bird Learning Center (daycare and preschool).

Special programs

Athletics
Aubrey High School participates in the boys sports of baseball, basketball, football, and wrestling. The school participates in the girls sports of basketball, softball, and volleyball. For the 2016 through 2017 school years, Aubrey High School will play football in UIL Class 4A.

See also

List of school districts in Texas
List of high schools in Texas

References

External links

School districts in Denton County, Texas